Symbiosis (from Greek , , "living together", from , , "together", and , bíōsis, "living") is any type of a close and long-term biological interaction between two different biological organisms, be it mutualistic, commensalistic, or parasitic. The organisms, each termed a symbiont, must be of different species. In 1879, Heinrich Anton de Bary defined it as "the living together of unlike organisms".

Symbiosis can be obligatory, which means that one or more of the symbionts depend on each other for survival, or facultative (optional), when they can generally live independently.

Symbiosis is also classified by physical attachment.  When symbionts form a single body it is called conjunctive symbiosis, while all other arrangements are called disjunctive symbiosis. When one organism lives on the surface of another, such as head lice on humans, it is called ectosymbiosis; when one partner lives inside the tissues of another, such as Symbiodinium within coral, it is termed endosymbiosis.

Definition

The definition of symbiosis was a matter of debate for 130 years. In 1877, Albert Bernhard Frank used the term symbiosis to describe the mutualistic relationship in lichens. In 1878, the German mycologist Heinrich Anton de Bary defined it as "the living together of unlike organisms". The definition has varied among scientists, with some advocating that it should only refer to persistent mutualisms, while others thought it should apply to all persistent biological interactions (in other words, to mutualism, commensalism, and parasitism, but excluding brief interactions such as predation). In the 21st century, the latter has become the definition widely accepted by biologists.

In 1949, Edward Haskell proposed an integrative approach with a classification of "co-actions", later adopted by biologists as "interactions".

Obligate versus facultative
Relationships can be obligate, meaning that one or both of the symbionts entirely depend on each other for survival. For example, in lichens, which consist of fungal and photosynthetic symbionts, the fungal partners cannot live on their own. The algal or cyanobacterial symbionts in lichens, such as Trentepohlia, can generally live independently, and their part of the relationship is therefore described as facultative (optional), or non-obligate.

Ectosymbiosis 

Ectosymbiosis is any symbiotic relationship in which the symbiont lives on the body surface of the host, including the inner surface of the digestive tract or the ducts of exocrine glands. Examples of this include ectoparasites such as lice; commensal ectosymbionts such as the barnacles, which attach themselves to the jaw of baleen whales; and mutualist ectosymbionts such as cleaner fish.

Competition 

Competition can be defined as an interaction between organisms or species, in which the fitness of one is lowered by the presence of another. Limited supply of at least one resource (such as food, water, and territory) used by both usually facilitates this type of interaction, although the competition may also exist over other 'amenities', such as females for reproduction (in the case of male organisms of the same species).

Mutualism

Mutualism or interspecies reciprocal altruism is a long-term relationship between individuals of different species where both individuals benefit. Mutualistic relationships may be either obligate for both species, obligate for one but facultative for the other, or facultative for both.

Many  of herbivores have mutualistic gut flora to help them digest plant matter, which is more difficult to digest than animal prey. This gut flora is compromises cellulose-digesting protozoans or bacteria living in the herbivores' intestines. Coral reefs result from mutualism between coral organisms and various algae living  inside them. Most land plants and land ecosystems rely on mutualism between the plants, which fix carbon from the air, and mycorrhyzal fungi, which help in extracting water and minerals from the ground.

An example of mutualism is the relationship between the ocellaris clownfish that dwell among the tentacles of Ritteri sea anemones. The territorial fish protects the anemone from anemone-eating fish, and in turn, the anemone stinging tentacles  protect the clownfish from its predators. A special mucus on the clownfish protects it from the stinging tentacles.

A further example is the goby, a fish which sometimes lives together with a shrimp. The shrimp digs and cleans up a burrow in the sand in which both the shrimp and the goby fish live. The shrimp is almost blind, leaving it vulnerable to predators when outside its burrow. In case of danger, the goby touches the shrimp with its tail to warn it. When that happens both the shrimp and goby quickly retreat into the burrow. Different species of gobies (Elacatinus spp.) also clean up ectoparasites in other fish, possibly another kind of mutualism.

A spectacular example of obligate mutualism is the relationship between the siboglinid tube worms and symbiotic bacteria that live at hydrothermal vents and cold seeps. The worm has no digestive tract and is wholly reliant on its internal symbionts for nutrition. The bacteria oxidize either hydrogen sulfide or methane, which the host supplies to them. These worms were discovered in the late 1980s at the hydrothermal vents near the Galapagos Islands and have since been found at deep-sea hydrothermal vents and cold seeps in all of the world's oceans.

Mutualism improves both organism's competitive ability and will outcompete organisms of the same species that lack the symbiont.

A facultative symbiosis is seen in encrusting bryozoans and hermit crabs. The bryozoan colony (Acanthodesia commensale) develops a cirumrotatory growth and offers the crab (Pseudopagurus granulimanus) a helicospiral-tubular extension of its living chamber that initially was situated within a gastropod shell.

Many types of tropical and sub-tropical ants have evolved very complex relationships with certain tree species.

Endosymbiosis 

Endosymbiosis is any symbiotic relationship in which one symbiont lives within the tissues of the other, either within the cells or extracellularly. Examples include diverse microbiomes: rhizobia, nitrogen-fixing bacteria that live in root nodules on legume roots; actinomycetes, nitrogen-fixing bacteria such as Frankia, which live in alder root nodules; single-celled algae inside reef-building corals; and bacterial endosymbionts that provide essential nutrients to about 10%–15% of insects.

In endosymbiosis, the host cell lacks some of the nutrients which the endosymbiont provides. As a result, the host favors endosymbiont's growth processes within itself by producing some specialized cells. These cells affect the genetic composition of the host in order to regulate the increasing population of the endosymbionts and ensure that these genetic changes are passed onto the offspring via vertical transmission (heredity).

As the endosymbiont adapts to the host's lifestyle, the endosymbiont changes dramatically. There is a drastic reduction in its genome size, as many genes are lost during the process of metabolism, and DNA repair and recombination, while important genes participating in the DNA-to-RNA transcription, protein translation and DNA/RNA replication are retained. The decrease in genome size is due to loss of protein coding genes and not due to lessening of inter-genic regions or open reading frame (ORF) size. Species that are naturally evolving and contain reduced sizes of genes can be accounted for an increased number of noticeable differences between them, thereby leading to changes in their evolutionary rates. When endosymbiotic bacteria related with insects are passed on to the offspring strictly via vertical genetic transmission, intracellular bacteria go across many hurdles during the process, resulting in the decrease in effective population sizes, as compared to the free-living bacteria. The incapability of the endosymbiotic bacteria to reinstate their wild type phenotype via a recombination process is called Muller's ratchet phenomenon. Muller's ratchet phenomenon, together with less effective population sizes, leads to an accretion of deleterious mutations in the non-essential genes of the intracellular bacteria. This can be due to lack of selection mechanisms prevailing in the relatively "rich" host environment.

Commensalism

Commensalism describes a relationship between two living organisms where one benefits and the other is not significantly harmed or helped. It is derived from the English word commensal, used of human social interaction. It derives from a medieval Latin word meaning sharing food, formed from com- (with) and mensa (table).

Commensal relationships may involve one organism using another for transportation (phoresy) or for housing (inquilinism), or it may also involve one organism using something another created, after its death (metabiosis). Examples of metabiosis are hermit crabs using gastropod shells to protect their bodies, and spiders building their webs on plants.

Parasitism

In a parasitic relationship, the parasite benefits while the host is harmed. Parasitism takes many forms, from endoparasites that live within the host's body to ectoparasites and parasitic castrators that live on its surface and micropredators like mosquitoes that visit intermittently. Parasitism is an extremely successful mode of life; about 40% of all animal species are parasites, and the average mammal species is host to 4 nematodes, 2 cestodes, and 2 trematodes.

Mimicry

Mimicry is a form of symbiosis in which a species adopts distinct characteristics of another species to alter its relationship dynamic with the species being mimicked, to its own advantage. Among the many types of mimicry are Batesian and Müllerian, the first involving one-sided exploitation, the second providing mutual benefit. Batesian mimicry is an exploitative three-party interaction where one species, the mimic, has evolved to mimic another, the model, to deceive a third, the dupe. In terms of signalling theory, the mimic and model have evolved to send a signal; the dupe has evolved to receive it from the model. This is to the advantage of the mimic but to the detriment of both the model, whose protective signals are effectively weakened, and of the dupe, which is deprived of an edible prey. For example, a wasp is a strongly-defended model, which signals with its conspicuous black and yellow coloration that it is an unprofitable prey to predators such as birds which hunt by sight; many hoverflies are Batesian mimics of wasps, and any bird that avoids these hoverflies is a dupe. In contrast, Müllerian mimicry is mutually beneficial as all participants are both models and mimics. For example, different species of bumblebee mimic each other, with similar warning coloration in combinations of black, white, red, and yellow, and all of them benefit from the relationship.

Amensalism

Amensalism is a non-symbiotic, asymmetric interaction where one species is harmed or killed by the other, and one is unaffected by the other. There are two types of amensalism, competition and antagonism (or antibiosis). Competition is where a larger or stronger organism deprives a smaller or weaker one of a resource. Antagonism occurs when one organism is damaged or killed by another through a chemical secretion. An example of competition is a sapling growing under the shadow of a mature tree. The mature tree can rob the sapling of necessary sunlight and, if the mature tree is very large, it can take up rainwater and deplete soil nutrients. Throughout the process, the mature tree is unaffected by the sapling. Indeed, if the sapling dies, the mature tree gains nutrients from the decaying sapling. An example of antagonism is Juglans nigra (black walnut), secreting juglone, a substance which destroys many herbaceous plants within its root zone.

Amensalism is often used to describe strongly asymmetrical competitive interactions, such as between the Spanish ibex and weevils of the genus Timarcha which feed upon the same type of shrub. Whilst the presence of the weevil has almost no influence on food availability, the presence of ibex has an enormous detrimental effect on weevil numbers, as they consume significant quantities of plant matter and incidentally ingest the weevils upon it.

Cleaning symbiosis

Cleaning symbiosis is an association between individuals of two species, where one (the cleaner) removes and eats parasites and other materials from the surface of the other (the client). It is putatively mutually beneficial, but biologists have long debated whether it is mutual selfishness, or simply exploitative. Cleaning symbiosis is well known among marine fish, where some small species of cleaner fish, notably wrasses but also species in other genera, are specialised to feed almost exclusively by cleaning larger fish and other marine animals.

Co-evolution and  Hologenome Theory 

Symbiosis is increasingly recognized as an important selective force behind evolution; many species have a long history of interdependent co-evolution.

Although symbiosis was once discounted as an anecdotal evolutionary phenomenon, evidence is now overwhelming that obligate or facultative associations among microorganisms and between microorganisms and multicellular hosts had crucial consequences in many landmark events in evolution and in the generation of phenotypic diversity and complex phenotypes able to colonise new environments.

Hologenome Development and Evolution 
Evolution originated  from changes in development where variations within species are selected for or against because of the symbionts involved. The Hologenome theory relates to the holobiont and symbionts genome together as a whole. Microbes live everywhere in and on every multicellular organism. Many organisms rely on their symbionts in order to develop properly, this is known as co-development. In cases of co-development the symbionts send signals to their host which determine developmental processes. Co-development is commonly seen in both arthropods and vertebrates.

Symbiogenesis

One hypothesis for the origin of the nucleus in eukaryotes (plants, animals, fungi, and protists) is that it developed from a symbiogenesis between bacteria and archaea. It is hypothesized that the symbiosis originated when ancient archaea, similar to modern methanogenic archaea, invaded and lived within bacteria similar to modern myxobacteria, eventually forming the early nucleus. This theory is analogous to the accepted theory for the origin of eukaryotic mitochondria and chloroplasts, which are thought to have developed from a similar endosymbiotic relationship between proto-eukaryotes and aerobic bacteria. Evidence for this includes the fact that mitochondria and chloroplasts divide independently of the cell, and that these organelles have their own genome.

The biologist Lynn Margulis, famous for her work on endosymbiosis, contended that symbiosis is a major driving force behind evolution. She considered Darwin's notion of evolution, driven by competition, to be incomplete and claimed that evolution is strongly based on co-operation, interaction, and mutual dependence among organisms. According to Margulis and her son Dorion Sagan, "Life did not take over the globe by combat, but by networking."

Co-evolutionary relationships

Mycorrhizas
About 80% of vascular plants worldwide form symbiotic relationships with fungi, in particular in arbuscular mycorrhizas.

Pollination

Flowering plants and the animals that pollinate them have co-evolved. Many plants that are pollinated by insects (in entomophily), bats, or birds (in ornithophily) have highly specialized flowers modified to promote pollination by a specific pollinator that is correspondingly adapted. The first flowering plants in the fossil record had relatively simple flowers. Adaptive speciation quickly gave rise to many diverse groups of plants, and, at the same time, corresponding speciation occurred in certain insect groups. Some groups of plants developed nectar and large sticky pollen, while insects evolved more specialized morphologies to access and collect these rich food sources. In some taxa of plants and insects, the relationship has become dependent, where the plant species can only be pollinated by one species of insect.

Acacia ants and acacias 

The acacia ant (Pseudomyrmex ferruginea) is an obligate plant ant that protects at least five species of "Acacia" (Vachellia) from preying insects and from other plants competing for sunlight, and the tree provides nourishment and shelter for the ant and its larvae.

Seed dispersal 

Seed dispersal is the movement, spread or transport of seeds away from the parent plant. Plants have limited mobility and rely upon a variety of dispersal vectors to transport their propagules, including both abiotic vectors such as the wind and living (biotic) vectors like birds. In order to attract animals, these plants evolved a set of morphological characters such as fruit colour, mass, and persistence correlated to particular seed dispersal agents. For example, plants may evolve conspicuous fruit colours to attract avian frugivores, and birds may learn to associate such colours with a food resource.

See also

Notes

References

Bibliography

External links 

TED-Education video – Symbiosis: a surprising tale of species cooperation

 
Ecology